Perstorps SK is a Swedish football club located in Perstorp.

Background
Perstorps Sportklubb was founded in 1925 and has specialised over the years in a number of sports including boxing, athletics, gymnastics, running sports, handball, orienteering, and cycling, as well as football, which has been the dominant sport.

Since their foundation Perstorps SK has participated mainly in the middle and lower divisions of the Swedish football league system.  They played four seasons in Division 2, which was then the second tier of Swedish football, in 1960 and from 1970 to 1972. The club currently plays in Division 3 Södra Götaland which is the fifth tier of Swedish football. They play their home matches at the Ybbarps Idrottsplats in Perstorp.

Perstorps SK are affiliated to Skånes Fotbollförbund.

Recent history
In recent seasons Perstorps SK have competed in the following divisions:

2010 – Division IV, Skåne Nordvästra
2009 – Division IV, Skåne Norra
2008 – Division IV, Skåne Norra
2007 – Division IV, Skåne Norra
2006 – Division IV, Skåne Norra
2005 – Division IV, Skåne Östra
2004 – Division III, Sydvästra Götaland
2003 – Division III, Sydvästra Götaland
2002 – Division III, Södra Götaland
2001 – Division III, Södra Götaland
2000 – Division III, Sydöstra Götaland
1999 – Division III, Södra Götaland

Attendances

In recent seasons Perstorps SK have had the following average attendances:

Footnotes

External links
 Perstorps SK – Official website
 Perstorps SK Facebook

Sport in Skåne County
Football clubs in Skåne County
Association football clubs established in 1925
1925 establishments in Sweden